The Kerala Legislative Assembly, popularly known as the Niyamasabha, is the State Assembly of Kerala, one of the 28 States in India. The Assembly is formed by 140 elected representatives. Each elected member represents one of the 140 constituencies within the borders of Kerala and is referred to as Member of the Legislative Assembly (MLA). The 14th Kerala Legislative Assembly consists of 140 elected members and one member nominated by the Governor from the Anglo-Indian Community.

Composition
The current Legislative Assembly is the 14th Assembly since the formation of Kerala. The Speaker of the Assembly is P. Sreeramakrishnan. The leader of the Assembly is Pinarayi Vijayan from CPI(M) and the Leader of the Opposition is Ramesh Chennithala from the INC. At the same time, the deputy leader of opposition is M. K. Muneer of IUML.

Political parties or coalitions

Members
Key

               
 NCK

See also
 2021 Kerala Legislative Assembly election
 2019 Kerala Legislative Assembly by-elections
 2016 Kerala Legislative Assembly election
 2011 Kerala Legislative Assembly election

References

 Legislators up to 2006
 http://klaproceedings.niyamasabha.org

External links
 Kerala Lok Sabha Election 2019 Results Website

 niyamasabha.org
 Kerala Assembly Election 2016 Website
 Election Database
 klaproceedings.niyamasabha.org

 
2016 establishments in Kerala
Kerala MLAs 2016–2021